Rudy Gaddini (born c. 1934) is a former American football coach.  He served as the head football coach and Milton College in Milton, Wisconsin from 1970 to
1981, compiling a record of 61–43–5.  A native of Chicago, Gaddini attended Fenwick High School in Oak Park, Illinois, where he played high school football and was an all-state fullback.  He moved on to Michigan State University, where played college football for the Spartans in 1955 and 1956.

Head coaching record

College football

References

Year of birth missing (living people)
1930s births
Living people
American football fullbacks
American football halfbacks
Dakota State Trojans football coaches
Michigan State Spartans football players
Milton Wildcats football coaches
Wisconsin–River Falls Falcons football coaches
Wisconsin–Oshkosh Titans football coaches
College wrestling coaches in the United States
High school football coaches in Illinois
High school wrestling coaches in the United States
Players of American football from Chicago
Sportspeople from Oak Park, Illinois
Coaches of American football from Illinois